MITM may refer to:
 Man-in-the-middle attack, a computer networking attack
 Meet-in-the-middle attack, a cryptographic attack
 Modern Institute of Technology and Management, India
 Master of Information Technology Management, a master's degree

 Malcolm in the Middle, an American sitcom

See also
 Man-in-the-mobile (MitMo), a computer security attack